is a private women's junior college in Odawara Kanagawa Prefecture, Japan.

Established in 1956, the school specializes in nutrition studies and child care.

External links
 Official website 

Educational institutions established in 1956
Private universities and colleges in Japan
Japanese junior colleges
Universities and colleges in Kanagawa Prefecture
Women's universities and colleges in Japan
1956 establishments in Japan
Odawara